During the 2015–16 season, PSV Eindhoven participated in the Dutch Eredivisie, the KNVB Cup, the Johan Cruyff Shield and the UEFA Champions League.

Squad

Competitions

Pre-season friendlies

Johan Cruyff Shield

Friendlies

Eredivisie

League table

Results summary

Matches
On 18 June 2015, the fixtures for the forthcoming season were announced.

KNVB Cup

UEFA Champions League

Group stage

Knockout phase

Round of 16

Statistics

Appearances and goals

|-

|}

Goalscorers

Clean sheets

Disciplinary record

Transfers

Transfers in

Transfers out

Loans in

Loans out

Overall transfer activity

Spending
Summer:  €17,600,000

Winter:

Total:  €17,600,000

Income
Summer:  €51,000,000

Winter:

Total:  €51,000,000

Expenditure
Summer:  €33,400,000

Winter:

Total:  €33,400,000

Jong PSV

Squad

Transfers in

Transfers out

Pre-season friendlies

Technical staff

References

PSV Eindhoven seasons
PSV Eindhoven
PSV Eindhoven
Dutch football championship-winning seasons